Den svenska psalmboken (The Swedish Hymnal) is the name of the official hymnal of the Church of Sweden. To date, there have been four official versions:

 Den svenska psalmboken (1695)
 Den svenska psalmboken (1819)
 Den svenska psalmboken (1937)
 Den svenska psalmboken (1986)